Louise's spiny mouse (Acomys louisae)  is a species of rodent in the family Muridae. It is found in Djibouti, Ethiopia, Kenya, and Somalia. Its natural habitats are dry savanna, subtropical or tropical dry lowland grassland, and rocky areas.

References

Acomys
Rodents of Africa
Mammals described in 1896
Taxa named by Oldfield Thomas
Taxonomy articles created by Polbot